Knivsta Municipality (Knivsta kommun) is a municipality in Uppsala County in east central Sweden. Its seat is located in the town of Knivsta, with some 7,100 inhabitants.

History
Until 1971 Knivsta was a municipality in Stockholm County, when it was merged into Uppsala Municipality and subsequently belonged to Uppsala County. On January 1, 2003 Knivsta was separated from Uppsala to once again form a separate municipality, located in Uppsala County.

The coat of arms symbolises the Stones of Mora where the Swedish Kings were elected in ancient times.

Localities
Alsike
Knivsta (seat)

Elections
These are the election results since the refounding of the municipality from the 2002 election.

Riksdag

Blocs

This lists the relative strength of the socialist and centre-right blocs since 1973, but parties not elected to the Riksdag are inserted as "other", including the Sweden Democrats results from 2002 to 2006. The coalition or government mandate marked in bold formed the government after the election.

References

External links

Knivsta Municipality - Official site
Knivsta map
Knivstabo.se - A webportal for citizens of Knivsta

Municipalities of Uppsala County
2003 establishments in Sweden
States and territories disestablished in 2003